The Gothenburg Synagogue at Stora Nygatan, near Drottningtorget, Gothenburg, Sweden, was opened in 1855 according to the designs of the German architect August Krüger. The congregation is Conservative. The synagogue sanctuary has 300 seats.

Between 25 and 30% of the membership fees are used for security measures, as Jews risk attack from Middle Eastern, far-left and far-right extremists.

The synagogue was firebombed on Saturday, 9 December 2017.  Three migrant men were arrested.  Prosecutor Stina Lundqvist said about 10 to 15 people may have attacked "in concert". The attack was condemned as antisemitic by mayor Ann-Sofie Hermansson. In the aftermath of the attack, the synagogue was visited by two cabinet ministers in a show of support from the highest political level.

References

External links
 Gothenburg Synagogue 

Ashkenazi Jewish culture in Sweden
Ashkenazi synagogues
Conservative Judaism in Europe
Synagogues in Sweden
Synagogue
1855 establishments in Sweden
Synagogues completed in 1855
Religious buildings and structures in Gothenburg
21st-century attacks on synagogues and Jewish communal organizations
Conservative synagogues